This is a complete listing of Public School Academy (PSA), or charter school districts in the state of Michigan.

 For intermediate school districts (ISDs), see list of intermediate school districts in Michigan. 
 For local education agency (LEA) districts, which include public schools, see list of local education agency districts in Michigan.

A
Academy For Business & Technology
Academy For Technology & Enterprise
Academy Of Detroit-West
Academy Of Flint
Academy Of Inkster
Academy Of Lathrup Village
Academy Of Michigan
Academy Of Oak Park
Academy Of Southfield
Academy Of Westland
Advanced Technology Academy
Allen Academy
Ann Arbor Learning Community
Arbor Academy
Arts Academy in the Woods

B
Bahweting Anishnabe Psa
Bay County Psa
Beacon International Academy
Blanche Kelso Bruce Academy
Burton Glen Charter Academy
Byron Center Charter School

C
Canton Charter Academy
Capital Area Academy
Casa Richard Academy
Casman Alternative Academy 
Center For Literacy And Creativity 
Central Academy (Michigan)
Cesar Chavez Academy
Chandler Park Academy
Chandler Woods Charter Academy 
Charlotte Forten Academy 
Charyl Stockwell Academy 
Chatfield School
Cheb-Otsego-Presque Isle Esd
Cherry Hill School Of Performing Arts 
Colin Powell Academy
Commonwealth Community Devel. Academy
Concord Academy - Petoskey
Concord Academy: Antrim
Concord Academy:boyne
Conner Creek Academy
Conner Creek Academy East
Creative Learning Academy Of Science
Creative Montessori Academy
Creative Technologies Academy
City Educational Academy Lab-e-Nelam Road Layyah
Cross Creek Charter Academy
Crossroads Charter Academy

D
David Ellis Academy
Dearborn Academy
Detroit Academy Of Arts And Sciences
Detroit Advantage Academy
Detroit Merit Charter Academy
Detroit School Of Industrial Arts
Dove Academy Of Detroit

E
Eagle Crest Charter Academy
Edison Public School Academy
Edison-Oakland Public School Academy
El-Hajj Malik El-Shabazz Academy
Endeavor Charter Academy

F
Francis Reh Psa

G
Gaudior Academy
George Crockett Academy
George Washington Carver Academy
Grand Blanc Academy
Grand Traverse Academy
Grattan Academy
Great Lakes Academy

H
Heart Academy
Henry Ford Academy
Holly Academy
Hope Academy
Hope Of Detroit Academy
Huron Academy

I
International Academy Of Flint
International Academy of Macomb
Island City Academy
Imperial Science Academy Layyah

J
Joy Preparatory Academy

K
Kalamazoo Advantage Academy
Kalamazoo R.E.S.A.
Kensington Woods High School
King Academy
Knapp Charter Academy

L
Lakeshore Public Academy
Landmark Academy
Linden Charter Academy
Livingston Esa

M
Macomb Academy
Madison Academy
Marilyn F. Lundy Academy
Marshall Academy
Martin Luther King Junior Education Center
Marvin L. Winans Academy Of Performing Arts
Merritt Academy
Metro Charter Academy
Metropolitan Transitional Academy
Michigan Automotive Academy
Michigan Early Elementary Center
Michigan Health Academy
Michigan International Prep School
Mid-Michigan Public School Academy
Mid-Peninsula School District
Midland Academy Advanced/Creative Studies
Midland County Esa
Mosaica Academy Of Saginaw
Muskegon Technical Academy

N
Nah Tah Wahsh Public School Academy
Nataki Talibah Schoolhouse Of Detroit
Navigator Academy 
New Bedford Academy 
New Beginnings Academy 
New City Academy
NexTech High School of Lansing
North Saginaw Charter Academy
North Star Academy
Northridge Academy
Northwest Academy
Nsoroma Institute

O
Oakland Academy 
Oakland International Academy
Old Redford Academy
Outlook Academy

P
Pansophia Academy
Paragon Charter Academy
Paramount Charter Academy
Pierre Toussaint Academy
Pontiac Academy for Excellence
Pontiac Psa
Presque Isle Academy Ii

R
Renaissance Public School Academy
Richfield Public School Academy
Ridge Park Charter Academy
Ross Hill Academy

S
Saginaw County Transition Academy
Saint Clair County Learning Academy
Sankofa Shule Academy (closed)
Sauk Trail Academy
South Arbor Charter Academy
Star International Academy
Summit Academy
Summit Academy North

T
The Learning Center Academy
Thomas-Gist Academy
Threshold Academy
Timberland Academy
Tri-Valley Academy
Trillium Performing Arts Academy

U
Universal Academy
University Preparatory Academy

V
Vanderbilt Charter Academy
Vanguard Charter Academy
Vista Charter Academy
Voyageur Academy

W
Walden Green Day School
Walker Charter Academy
Walter French Academy
Walton Charter Academy
Warrendale Charter Academy
West Mi Academy For Hospitality Science
West Mi Academy Of Arts & Academics
West Mi Academy Of Environmental Science
West MI Aviation Academy
West Village Academy
Weston Technical Academy
White Pine Academy
Will Carleton Academy
William C. Abney Academy
Windemere Park Charter Academy
Woodland Park Academy
Woodward Academy (Michigan)|Woodward Academy

Y
YMCA Service Learning Academy

References 

 public
Education